Water polo was contested for men only at the 1967 Pan American Games in Winnipeg, Manitoba, Canada.

Competing teams
Six teams contested the event.

Medalists

References
 Pan American Games water polo medalists on HickokSports

1967
1967 Pan American Games
1967
1967 in water polo